The 1900 Beloit football team was an American football team that represented Beloit College in the 1900 college football season.  In John W. Hollister's 5th year as head coach, Beloit compiled a 7–1–2 record, and outscored their opponents 253 to 23.

Schedule

References

Beloit
Beloit Buccaneers football seasons
Beloit football